St Peter's Church in Satterleigh, Devon, England was built in the 15th century. It is recorded in the National Heritage List for England as a designated Grade I listed building, and is now a redundant church in the care of the Churches Conservation Trust.  It was vested in the Trust on 19 March 1996.

The church is mainly 15th century, although it may incorporate parts of an earlier building. It has an aisleless nave,  and a wooden bell-cote. The chancel was rebuilt in 1852 as part of a wider restoration.

See also
 List of churches preserved by the Churches Conservation Trust in South West England

References

15th-century church buildings in England
Church of England church buildings in Devon
Grade I listed churches in Devon
Churches preserved by the Churches Conservation Trust